Zagradišče is a settlement in the hills east of Ljubljana, the capital of Slovenia. It is included in the City Municipality of Ljubljana. It is part of the traditional region of Lower Carniola and is now part of the Central Slovenia Statistical Region.

References

External links

Zagradišče on Geopedia

Populated places in the City Municipality of Ljubljana
Sostro District